Elliot's bird of paradise is a bird in the family Paradisaeidae that is presumed to be an intergeneric hybrid between a black sicklebill and Arfak astrapia. This assumption was made by Erwin Stresemann who had also dismissed other new species of birds of paradise as hybrids. A minority of ornithologists dispute this claim; specimens are considerably smaller than the latter two species. Additionally, Stresemann used the A. nigra x E. fastuosus explanation for the astrapian sicklebill as well.  It was first described by Edward Ward in 1873.

History
 
Only two adult male specimens are known of this bird, held in the British Natural History Museum and the Dresden Natural History Museum, and presumably deriving from the Vogelkop Peninsula of north-western New Guinea.

Notes

References
 

Hybrid birds of paradise
Birds of New Guinea
Intergeneric hybrids